Uvitonic acid (6-methyl-2,4-pyridinedicarboxylic acid) is an organic compound with the formula CH3C5H2N(COOH)2. The acid is a pyridine analogue of the benzene derivative uvitic acid.
Under normal conditions, the acid is a white crystalline substance.

Preparation
Uvitonic acid is obtained by the action of ammonia on pyruvic acid.

See also
Uvitic acid

References

External links
Chemical book

Monomers
Dicarboxylic acids
Pyridines